Heernt was an American, New York-based, jazz and indie rock trio. The group makes use of different sounds and rhythms led by its drummer and founder Mark Guiliana, who has been a member of the Avishai Cohen Trio and an innovative leader of shmagigi. Some of the instruments and items used by the group produce sounds akin to the cajón, trombone, typewriter, steelpan, flute and clarinet.

Discography
Locked In A Basement (2006)

References

External links
Heernt official homepage
Mark Guiliana's official homepage
Clip of Heernt performing

Indie rock musical groups from New York (state)
Musical groups from New York City
Jazz musicians from New York (state)